Apomempsis similis is a species of beetle in the family Cerambycidae. It was described by Stephan von Breuning in 1939. It is known from Cameroon.

Its type locality was only recorded as Cameroon.

References

Endemic fauna of Cameroon
Morimopsini
Beetles described in 1939
Taxa named by Stephan von Breuning (entomologist)